Scavengers is the second album from New York-based band Calla.

Track listing
All tracks by Calla

 "Fear of Fireflies" – 4:21
 "Hover over Nowhere" – 7:22
 "Traffic Sound" – 3:52
 "Tijerina" – 6:12
 "Slum Creeper" – 4:46
 "The Swarm" – 5:22
 "Mayzelle" – 3:13
 "Love of Ivah" – 5:15
 "A Fondness for Crawling" – 2:22
 "Promenade" (Bono, U2) – 5:16

Personnel 

 Calla – Producer, Engineer, Art Direction
 Sean Donovan – Bass, Keyboards, Programming, Engineer
 Michael Gira – Producer, Art Direction
 Chris Griffin – Mastering
 Aurelio Valle – Guitar, Vocals

2001 albums
Calla (band) albums
Young God Records albums